Dakshin Bedkashi Union is a union parishad of Koyra Upazila of Khulna District, in Khulna Division, Bangladesh.

References

Unions of Koyra Upazila
Populated places in Khulna District